The De Warenne Academy is a secondary school with academy status on Gardens Lane in Conisbrough, South Yorkshire, England.

The Academy is sponsored by Delta Academies trust who also support many other schools in Doncaster.

History
The school changed its name (from  Northcliffe School) in September 2009, when it became an academy and moved into a new building in 2013. Previously it had been Northcliffe School, a secondary modern school.

The school was the centre of controversy in the early 2000s due to a proposal to convert it into an academy run by the Emmanuel Schools Foundation, a Christian charity. The proposal was withdrawn in 2004 after legal threats by the National Secular Society.

Doncaster Collegiate Sixth Form 
The school is part of the Doncaster Collegiate Sixth Form which combines the sixth form offering from Ash Hill Academy, De Warenne Academy, Don Valley Academy, Rossington All Saints Academy and Serlby Park Academy.

References

External links
 EduBase

News items
 Teacher attacked September 2005 by former pupils
 Injured teacher
 Pupil killed by air gun in May 2005
 Academy plan dropped in October 2004
 Parents put school on eBay in September 2004
 Protest over Academy plan in June 2004
 Placed in special measures in 2003

Conisbrough
Academies in Doncaster
Secondary schools in Doncaster
Delta schools